Teuta (3rd century BC) was queen of the Ardiaei tribe in Illyria. 

Teuta may also refer to:

People
Teuta Arifi (born 1969), Macedonian politician of Albanian origin
Teuta Cuni (born 1973), retired Swedish boxer
 (born 1982), Kosovo Albanian actress
 (born 1986), Kosovo Albanian singer
Teuta Matoshi, Kosovo Albanian fashion designer
 (born 1976), Kosovo Albanian singer
Teuta Topi (born 1961), former First Lady of Albania

Other
BC Teuta Durrës, an Albanian basketball team
KF Teuta Durrës, an Albanian football team
Teuta Vissarion, the eponymous character of Bram Stoker's 1909 novel The Lady of the Shroud